Stephen M. Saland (born November 12, 1943) is an American attorney and politician. He was a Republican member of the New York State Senate, representing the 41st District from 1990 to 2012. Prior to his Senate tenure, Saland served in the New York State Assembly. Saland is notable as one of four Republican Members of the New York State Senate that voted in favor of the Marriage Equality Act in 2011. Following his vote for same-sex marriage, Saland lost his 2012 re-election bid to Democrat Terry Gipson. Since 2016, Saland has served on the board of the state Thruway Authority.

Biography
A native of Poughkeepsie, Saland earned a Bachelor of Arts degree from the University at Buffalo in 1965 and a Juris Doctor from Rutgers Law School in 1968.

Saland worked as a legislative aide to a New Jersey Assemblyman, and later as an executive assistant to New York Assemblyman Emeel S. Betros. Saland worked as a lawyer in Betros' law firm. He began his own career in public service as a town councilman in Wappinger. In April 1980, Saland was elected to the New York State Assembly in District 99 to fill the vacancy created by the death of Betros. His first action as a state legislator was to introduce a bill requiring the state to reimburse school districts for interest debts they incurred from borrowing money because of New York's budget crisis. Saland was re-elected several times, and remained in the Assembly until 1990.

Saland was a member of the New York State Senate (41st District) from 1991 to 2012. After voting for same-sex marriage in 2011, Saland received a Republican primary challenge from Neil Di Carlo in 2012. Di Carlo made a campaign issue of Saland's same-sex marriage vote. Although Saland won the primary by a margin of 107 votes, Di Carlo continued his campaign as the candidate of the Conservative Party. Saland lost the general election to Democrat Terry Gipson by 2,096 votes; Di Carlo acted as a spoiler, receiving 17,300 votes on the Conservative line.

In 2016, Saland was appointed to the board of the state Thruway Authority by Gov. Andrew Cuomo. The State Senate confirmed his appointment in June 2016.

Saland is a direct descendant of a former Ashkenazic Chief Rabbi of Jerusalem, Shmuel Salant.

2011 same-sex marriage vote
On June 24, 2011, Saland cast the deciding vote in favor of New York's Marriage Equality Act, which legalized same-sex marriage in New York. Saland announced that he would vote "yes" on June 24, 2011—the same day that the bill came to the Senate floor for a vote. Saland had previously voted "no" on same-sex marriage in December 2009. While speaking in defense of an amendment exempting religious organizations from recognizing same-sex marriage, Saland described his vote as a vote of conscience: "I have defined doing the right thing as treating all persons with equality ... And that equality includes the definition of marriage. I fear that to do otherwise would fly in the face of my upbringing". Saland was one of four Republican state senators that voted in favor of the Marriage Equality Act.

Sources

External links

1943 births
Jewish American state legislators in New York (state)
Living people
Republican Party members of the New York State Assembly
Republican Party New York (state) state senators
Politicians from Poughkeepsie, New York
21st-century American politicians
University at Buffalo alumni
21st-century American Jews